Alam is a masculine name derived from several ancient languages including :

 Arabic:  (ʿĀlam) meaning "world" or "universe"
 Hebrew: cognate word  is transcribed as Olam, also meaning "World"
 Tagalog: Alam means "Knowledge" (Wisdom). adjective maalam, is referred to for the one who is knowledgeable and wise.
 Malay: Alam means "Field of interest", "nature", "realm", "world". Use "Ilmu alam" means "Natural Studies" or "Geography".
 Hindi: Alam means "the whole world; world".
 Urdu: Alam means "the whole world; world".

Use in literature 

Arabic literature and ancient text, use Alam in phrases like "Rab-ul-Alam-een" = "the Lord of all Worlds/Universes" referring to The Absolute and Highest Divinity.

In Hebrew, Olam is used in phrases like "Adon Olam", meaning "Master of the World," one of the names of God in Judaism.

People

Surname

surname  ("world")
 Intikhab Alam (born 1941), British Indian (Pakistani) cricketer
 Muhammad Mahmood Alam (1935–2013), Mr M. M. Alam, Pakistani Air Force officer who is famous for his world record in air-to-air combat
 Said Alam, Pakistani pediatric surgeon and political activist

unidentified surnames transliterated as Alam
 Abdul Qadir Alam, governor of Ghor Province, Afghanistan
 ABM Nurul Alam (1929–1971), Bangladesh physician
 Abrar Alam (born 1996), Bangladeshi cricketer
Adeel Alam (born 1986), Pakistani-American wrestler better known by his ring name Mustafa Ali
 Aftab Alam (disambiguation), several
 Aftabuddin Alam (born 1993), Indian cricketer
 Ahmed Alam (born 1972), field hockey player
 Alexander Alam (1896–1983), Australian businessman, politician, and philanthropist
 Ali Alam (born 1977), Pakistani underground musician
 Amir-Hossein Khozeimé Alam (died 2002), eldest son of Amir Ma'soum Khan Khozeiméh
 Ammad Alam (born 1998), Pakistani cricketer
 Arish Alam (born 1986), Indian cricketer
 Asadollah Alam (1919–1978), Iranian politician
 A.T.M. Zahirul Alam (born 1952), retired lieutenant general of Bangladesh Army
 Ava Alam (1947–1976), Bangladeshi singer and music teacher
 Badiul Alam (born 1949), Bangladeshi academic
 Badre Alam (born 1992), Indian cricketer
 Didarul Alam (born 1968), Bangladesh Awami League politician
 Faisal Alam (born 1977), gay Pakistani American who founded the Al-Fatiha Foundation
 Fakrul Alam (born 1951), Bangladeshi academic, writer, and translator
 Fareena Alam (born 1978), English journalist and was editor
 Faria Alam (born 1966), Bangladeshi society figure and television personality
 Faruque Alam (born 1940), Bangladeshi civil engineer and wood technologist
 Fawad Alam (born 1985), Pakistani cricketer and actor
 Fouad Salam Alam (born 1951), Egyptian volleyball player
 Ghulam Dastagir Alam (1933–2000), Pakistani theoretical physicist and professor
 Gulzar Alam (born 1959), Pashto singer
 Gurdas Ram Alam (1912–1989), Punjabi language poet
 Ikhfanul Alam (born 1984), Indonesian footballer
 Israfil Alam (born 1966), Bangladesh Awami League Politician
 Jafar Alam, Bangladeshi politician
 Jahanara Alam (born 1993), Bangladeshi cricketer
 Jahangir Alam (disambiguation), several
 Javeed Alam (1943–2016), activist and thinker
 Johnny Alam, Canadian researcher, visual artist, and curator
 Khandaker Nurul Alam (1937–2016), Bangladeshi music composer and singer
 Khorshed Alam, fifth Governor of Bangladesh Bank
 Khurshid Alam (born 1940s), Bangladeshi playback singer
 Leena Alam (born 1978)
 M. Shahid Alam, Pakistani economist, academic, and social scientist
 Mahbub Alam (disambiguation), several
 Mahbubey Alam, designated senior counsel and Attorney General of Bangladesh
 Mehboob Alam (born 1981), Raees, India
 Mohammad Habibul Alam, Vice-chairman of the World Scout Committee
 Mozaffar Alam (1882–1973), Iranian military and political figure
 Nawab Alam Yar Jung Bahadur (1890–1970), Indian politician

Given name

given name  ("world")
 Alam Channa (1953–1998), son of Nasir Channa of Dhoke Kashmirian was the world's tallest living man at 232.4 cm (7 ft 7 inch) high. During his life he had been billed at various heights of up to 7 ft 6 while working at a circus
 Alam Lohar (1928–1979), prominent Punjabi folk music from the Punjab region of Pakistan, formerly British India. He is credited with popularising the musical term Jugni

unidentified given names transliterated as Alam
 Alam al-Din al-Hanafi (1178–1251), Egyptian mathematician, astronomer and engineer
 Alam al-Malika (died 1130), leader of Zubayd in Yemen
 Alam Dad Lalika (born 1987), Pakistani politician
 Alam Khan (actor), Indian actor, model, and dancer
 Alam Khan (composer), Bangladeshi composer and music director
 Alam Khattak, Pakistani army general
 Alam Gul Kuchi, Afghan politician
 Alam Mir (born 1944)
 Alam Muzaffarnagari (1901–1969), pseudonym of  Muhammad Ishaaq, Indian poet
 Alam Shah, the fourth and last ruler of the Sayyid dynasty
 Alam Zeb (athlete) (born 1930), Pakistani middle-distance runner

Fictional characters
 Alam Ara, eponymous protagonist of a 1931 film directed by Ardeshir Irani,  the first Indian sound film

See also
 Alama, a given name and surname
 Alamabad (disambiguation)
 Alamal (disambiguation) (al-amal "hope" or al-ʿamal "work")
 
 

Arabic-language surnames
Urdu-language surnames